Alan Michaels may refer to:

 Alan C. Michaels, law professor
 Al Michaels (Alan Richard Michaels, born 1944), American television sportscaster
 Alan Michaels, DJ at WMXJ